Malachy Martin Donaghy (born 13 September 1957 in Belfast) is a former Northern Ireland international footballer who played for Luton Town and Manchester United.

Career

Club career
The current Northern Ireland Under-19 coach, originally from West Belfast, began his football career as a goalkeeper with little-known Down and Connor League side team St. Agnes', before moving on to play as an outfield player for works team Post Office Social Club.

After barely six months, he was on the move again, this time joining Amateur League side Cromac Albion, where his blossoming talent was spotted by then Larne boss Brian Halliday.

Donaghy's rapid rise in the game continued when, after just 20 matches with the Inver Park club, he was transferred to Luton Town in June 1978 for a fee of £20 000.

He spent 10 years at Luton Town, overseeing the most successful era of their history to date. He collected a Second Division title winner's medal in 1982, enabling him to experience First Division football for the first time yet. He helped Luton retain their First Division status, and was a key part of the team that finished a club record high of seventh in the 1986–87 season. In 1987–88, he helped Luton win their first major trophy as they achieved a shock 3–2 win over Arsenal in the 1988 Football League Cup Final.

In October 1988, Donaghy departed from Kenilworth Road in a £650,000 move to his boyhood heroes Manchester United. It was at the time a big risk for Alex Ferguson to pay out a large sum of money for a 31-year-old, but Donaghy repaid the United manager's faith in him with some consistent performances in not only his favoured central defensive position but also as a full-back.

Immediately after joining United, Donaghy was the club's first-choice left-back for the 1988–89 season, missing only the League Cup game for which he was cup-tied. However, his opportunities were limited in the 1989–90 season, and he was unable to make even the substitutes bench for the 1990 FA Cup Final triumph over Crystal Palace. However, he did make the substitutes bench for the European Cup Winners' Cup triumph in 1990–91.

United were First Division runners-up in 1991–92 and won their first-ever League Cup, but Donaghy's first-team chances continued to be restricted and he was also left out of the side that beat Nottingham Forest in the League Cup final.

His next move was in August 1992 when, just a month short of his 35th birthday, Chelsea manager Ian Porterfield paid £100,000 for his services.

Donaghy helped Chelsea finish 11th in the inaugural Premier League season and helped them reach the FA Cup final in 1993–94, although he did not make the squad for the team that lost 4–0 to Double-winners Manchester United. At the end of that season, Donaghy announced his retirement from club football.

He made his final appearance for Northern Ireland against Mexico in Miami in June 1994, three months before his 37th birthday.

Shortly after his playing career ended, Donaghy returned to the province with his family and after a brief spell as manager at Newry Town, he had stints as a coach with Cliftonville and as a Youth Development Officer back on his home patch with Donegal Celtic. In 2000, he was appointed to his present position as coach for the Northern Ireland Under-19 team.

His son Ciaran currently plays for Carrick Rangers.

International career
The first of his 91 caps came in May 1980 at Windsor Park in the 1–0 Home International Championship victory over Scotland. He further enhanced his reputation during the 1982 and 1986 World Cup finals. In the former tournament, he played in four of Northern Ireland's five games. He was sent off after 60 minutes of the famous 1–0 win over Spain in Valencia, for the offence of shoving Spain's José Antonio Camacho, but returned for Northern Ireland's final match, the 4–1 defeat by France in Madrid.

Honours

Club
Luton Town
League Cup: 1987–88

Manchester United
European Cup Winners Cup: 1990–91
FA Charity Shield: 1990
European Super Cup: 1991

References

External links

Profile at StretfordEnd.co.uk

1957 births
Association football defenders
Association footballers from Northern Ireland
Chelsea F.C. players
Football managers from Northern Ireland
Larne F.C. players
NIFL Premiership players
Living people
Luton Town F.C. players
Manchester United F.C. players
Northern Ireland international footballers
Association footballers from Belfast
Premier League players
English Football League players
1982 FIFA World Cup players
1986 FIFA World Cup players
Outfield association footballers who played in goal